The 1977 XIII FIBA International Christmas Tournament "Trofeo Raimundo Saporta" was the 13th edition of the FIBA International Christmas Tournament. It took place at Sports City of Real Madrid Pavilion, Madrid, Spain, on 24, 25 and 26 December 1977 with the participations of Real Madrid (champions of the 1976–77 Liga Española de Baloncesto), Australia, Defensor Sporting and Bradley Braves.

League stage

Day 1, December 24, 1977

|}

Day 2, December 25, 1977

|}

Day 3, December 26, 1977

|}

Final standings

References

1977–78 in European basketball
1977–78 in Spanish basketball